Joe Ward may refer to:

 Joe Ward (baseball) (1884–1934), American baseball player
 Joe Ward (basketball) (born 1963), American basketball player
 Joe Ward (boxer) (born 1993), Irish boxer
 Joe Ward (footballer, born 1954), Scottish footballer
 Joe Ward (footballer, born 1995), English footballer
 Joe Ward (ice hockey) (born 1961), Canadian ice hockey player
 Joe Ward (rugby union) (born 1980), New Zealand rugby player

See also
 Joanne Ward, British tennis player
 Joseph Ward (disambiguation)
 Joel Ward (disambiguation)